Lo mai gai, literally "glutinous rice chicken", is a classic dim sum dish served during yum cha. The portion size of lo mai gai is generally quite large, so there is a smaller variant created known as jan ju gai.

Description
Lo mai gai is mostly a southern Chinese food. It contains glutinous rice filled with chicken, Chinese mushrooms, Chinese sausage, scallions, and sometimes dried shrimp or salted egg. The ball of rice is then wrapped in a dried lotus leaf and steamed. In North America, banana or grape leaves may be used instead.

Gallery

See also

Bánh chưng
Bánh tét
Bánh tẻ
Chinese sticky rice
Corunda
Hallaca
Pamonha
Pasteles
Suman
Tamale
Zongzi

Notes

References

Dim sum
Cantonese cuisine
Cantonese words and phrases
Hong Kong cuisine
Glutinous rice dishes
Singaporean cuisine